Serp i Molot ("hammer and sickle") is a Moscow Railway station of the Gorkovskaya line and prospective station on Line D2 and D4 of the Moscow Central Diameters in Moscow, Russia. It was opened in 1936 and will be rebuilt by late 2024.

Gallery

References

Railway stations in Moscow
Railway stations of Moscow Railway
Railway stations in the Soviet Union opened in 1936